Arpechim Refinery  was one of the largest Romanian refineries and one of the largest in Europe, located in Pitești, Argeș County, and had both refining and petrochemical capacities. It was closed in 2011. The refinery has two processing modules with a nominal capacity of 6.5 million tonnes/year. The facility is connected by pipeline to the oil fields in the Oltenia Region and to the Port of Constanţa. The refinery produces around 60% of all the bitumen used in Romania.

History
Arpechim was founded in 1964 in a strategic industrial zone located in Southern Romania near Pitești. In the same year the refinery built its first plant specialised in the production of carbon black. In 1967 another two distinct units were established, the Pitești Refinery and the Petrochemical Complex and the Thermal Power Station. In 1971 the refinery was integrated with the Petrochemical Complex. In 1997 the state established Petrom as the national oil company also including the Arpechim Refinery. In 1999 Arpechim becomes the first refinery in Europe to produce and export diesel with a reduced sulfur content. In 2005 the refinery concludes the building of a new gasoil hydrotreater and new hydrogen plant. 

In 2007, Petrom started negotiations with Oltchim (a major petrochemical company in Romania) for the sale of the petrochemical sector from the Arpechim Refinery. The two companies agreed on the transaction and Oltchim had to pay around US$ 150 million to close the deal. On February 17, 2009, Petrom decided to sell the petrochemical sector of the Arpechim Refinery to Oltchim for the price of 1 euro (US$ 1.25), but the buying company has to invest US$ 140 million in the sector due to contract clauses.

References

External links
Official site

Oil and gas companies of Romania
Oil refineries in Romania
Pitești
Buildings and structures in Argeș County
Companies of Argeș County
Non-renewable resource companies established in 1964